Murraysville is a census-designated place (CDP) in New Hanover County, North Carolina, United States. The population was 14,215 at the 2010 census, up from 7,279 in 2000. It is part of the Wilmington Metropolitan Statistical Area.

Geography
Murraysville is located at  (34.287766, -77.844741).

According to the United States Census Bureau, the CDP has a total area of 11.5 square miles (29.8 km2), all  land.

Demographics

2020 census

As of the 2020 United States census, there were 16,582 people, 6,646 households, and 4,370 families residing in the CDP.

2000 census
As of the census of 2000, there were 7,279 people, 2,896 households, and 2,079 families residing in the CDP. The population density was 632.7 people per square mile (244.4/km2). There were 3,060 housing units at an average density of 266.0/sq mi (102.7/km2). The racial makeup of the CDP was 79.68% White, 17.69% African American, 0.19% Native American, 0.85% Asian, 0.03% Pacific Islander, 0.27% from other races, and 1.28% from two or more races. Hispanic or Latino of any race were 1.47% of the population.

There were 2,896 households, out of which 37.6% had children under the age of 18 living with them, 58.5% were married couples living together, 10.5% had a female householder with no husband present, and 28.2% were non-families. 20.4% of all households were made up of individuals, and 3.2% had someone living alone who was 65 years of age or older. The average household size was 2.51 and the average family size was 2.91.

In the CDP, the population was spread out, with 25.8% under the age of 18, 8.1% from 18 to 24, 41.6% from 25 to 44, 18.6% from 45 to 64, and 6.0% who were 65 years of age or older. The median age was 31 years. For every 100 females, there were 94.9 males. For every 100 females age 18 and over, there were 90.5 males.

The median income for a household in the CDP was $45,815, and the median income for a family was $50,120. Males had a median income of $32,928 versus $25,092 for females. The per capita income for the CDP was $19,477. About 7.5% of families and 9.7% of the population were below the poverty line, including 9.8% of those under age 18 and 3.9% of those age 65 or over.

References

Census-designated places in New Hanover County, North Carolina
Census-designated places in North Carolina
Cape Fear (region)